The Institute of Algological Research (sometimes referred to as Muroran Marine Station, or Northern Hemisphere Field Station) in Muroran, is one of the oldest research institutes for Phycology research in Japan. Institute of Algological Research is located in the town of Muroran, Hokkaidō, Japan and is involved in research leading to MS and PhD degrees in Phycology.  Graduate students are often registered with Hokkaido University.

History

The Institute of Algological Research was founded in 1933.

Habitat

Coastal zone surrounding the institute has one of the largest seaweed biodiversity in  Japan, with over 200 species of macroalgae. The intertidal rocky shore is covered with luxuriant growth of seaweeds belonging to such diverse genera as Ulvophyceae, Rhodophyceae and Phaeophyceae. The close proximity to this very diverse natural habitat makes Institute of Algological Research, one of the most prominent Phycological research institute in the world.

Faculty and Research

Faculty

Taizo Motomura(Working on Spindle formation in Brown algal zygotes)
Yotsukura Norishige(Working on Mitosis and Cytokinesis in Brown algae).
Chikako Nagasato(Working on taxonomy and ecophysiology of Laminariales)

Notable alumni
Ichiro Mine
Kazuo Okuda
Tatewaki

See also 
 The Usa Marine Biological Institute is a similar research facility located in Usa cho, Japan.
 The Woods Hole Oceanographic Institution is also a similar oceanographic facility located at Woods Hole in Massachusetts.
 The Friday Harbor Laboratories in the United States also conducts similar research in Marine Biology.

References

Motomura, T. and Nagasato, C. (2003) The first spindle formation in brown algal zygotes. Hydrobiologia (in press).

Nagasato, C. and Motomura, T. (2002) New pyrenoid formation in the brown alga, Scytosiphon lomentaria (Scytosiphonales, Phaeophyceae). Journal of Phycology 38: 800-806.

Yotsukura, N., Kawai, T., Motomura, T. and Ichimura, T. (2001) Random amplified polymorphic DNA markers for three Japanese laminarian species. Fisheries Science 67:857-862.

External links
Institute of Algological Research

Oceanographic organizations